Spring Valley High School is a high school located in Spring Valley, New York, educating students in grades 9 through 12.

Spring Valley is one of two high schools in the East Ramapo Central School District (ERCSD). The school is accredited by the New York State Board of Regents.

The School District
The East Ramapo Central School District is the largest school district in Rockland County, New York. Spring Valley High School and Ramapo High School are the two high schools within East Ramapo.

East Ramapo Marching Band
Spring Valley High School and Ramapo High School form the East Ramapo Marching Band. The band was featured in the 2004 film The Manchurian Candidate.

The school

History

Records indicate that Albert Henry Goodhardt was the first clerk of the Spring Valley Board of Education after its incorporation in 1902.  Following that, he was trustee of the Spring Valley High School for six years, and president of the Board of Education for the Village of Spring Valley for five years.

Spring Valley High School was first located on Main Street (Route 45) in Spring Valley, New York. Around 1958, it became Spring Valley Junior High, and the new high school on Route 59 was opened. Honor students were enlisted to make the transition as smoothly as possible. As the population in the area rose, Spring Valley Junior High School and Spring Valley Senior High School were built (Spring Valley Junior High School being located in present-day Chestnut Ridge, New York and renamed "Chestnut Ridge Middle School", and Spring Valley Senior High School being located at its present-day address).

The first underground newspaper, The Bohemia, was created, published, and distributed throughout the student body in 1959.  It contained news, politics, social information, and mostly humor. This effort was unsanctioned, but it was supported by parents and heroic teachers including Larry Hopp (science) and Robert Kreps (art). Students credits included Jay Frogel (Salutatorian 1962), and Michael Potash (valedictorian 1962).

Curriculum
Spring Valley High School offers a 200 course curriculum.  Presently, this includes 16 Advanced Placement courses in the five major departments, as well as college credit courses offered through two universities. 45% or more of students taking AP exams score a "3" or better on average at SVHS.  In the 1950s and 1960s, the curriculum was one to two years behind that of New York City schools.  For example, the mathematics department did not offer calculus.

Educational tools
 A library media center with more than 20,000 volumes.

Student placement
Grouping in Spring Valley is by ability, achievement, and teacher evaluation.  Those in advanced placement courses constitute the upper 10% of the student body.  Those in honors courses comprise the upper 20% of the student body.  Regents courses contain students in the average academic group.

Graduation requirements

Recognition/achievements

Spring Valley High School has been cited by The College Board for the excellence of its Advanced Placement program.
In the last five years an average of 93% of students continue of to post-secondary education, with an average of 52% going to four-year institutions.  The five-year average for scholarship monies received is $2.75 million.
Spring Valley High School was ranked by Newsweek among the top 500 high schools in the nation for four consecutive years.
 Spring Valley High School was ranked one of America's best high schools in 2010 by Newsweek.
 Spring Valley's Key Club is one of the most respected high school service organizations anywhere.  It was ranked "Best in the World" six times during the 1990s and continues to win countless awards.
 The Spring Valley Debate Team is consistently ranked among the top 5 in The Rockland County Championships.
 Spring Valley's co-educational athletic program consists of 22 separate teams.
 The Microbiotics program received newspaper and television coverage.
 Intel Science Talent Research Semi-Finalist and Ron Brown Finalist.
 Spring Valley ranked in the top 10 Science Olympiad for the region.

Notable alumni
Marty Appel: Class of 1966; public relations and sports management executive, television executive producer, and author of 20 books.
Joel Berg: Class of 1982, anti-hunger activist and author.
Phil Bogle: former American football guard in the National Football League for the San Diego Chargers.
 Jonathan Eig: Class of 1982, writer of five non-fiction books, as well articles for The Wall Street Journal, The New York Times, Esquire, and Chicago Magazine.
 David Fried: former Rockland County legislator.
 Roger Graham: former American football running back. Winner of the 1993 Harlon Hill Trophy.
 Lucy Grealy: (1963–2002, Dublin, Ireland), poet and memoirist.  Author of Autobiography of a Face, first published in 1994 and released again in 2003.
 John Harvey: former American football running back in the National Football League for the Tampa Bay Buccaneers.
Mondaire Jones: Class of 2005, Member of the United States House of Representatives from New York's 17th district.
 Seth Joyner: former American football linebacker in the National Football League for the Philadelphia Eagles, Arizona Cardinals, Green Bay Packers and Denver Broncos.
 Clayton Landey: Class of 1968 is in his 40th year as a professional performer, actor, director, producer, writer and teacher.  Best known for his role in Knots Landing.
 Eugene Levy (politician)
 Bishop Nehru: American rapper signed to Mass Appeal
 Gerald S. O'Loughlin: Gerald Stuart O'Loughlin Jr. (b. 1921),  television, stage, and film actor and director who was primarily known for playing tough-talking and rough-looking characters.
 R-Kal Truluck: former American football defensive end in the National Football League for the Kansas City Chiefs, Green Bay Packers and Arizona Cardinals.

References

External links
 Spring Valley High School

Schools in Rockland County, New York
Public high schools in New York (state)